Purgatory Peak is a peak 2 nautical miles (3.7 km) southwest of Pond peak in the Saint Johns Range of Victoria Land. So named by the New Zealand Northern Survey Party of the Commonwealth Trans-Antarctic Expedition, 1956–58, because of the extremely trying weather and surface conditions encountered while traveling toward and surveying from this peak.

Mountains of Victoria Land
Scott Coast